S. G. Esmatur Mominin is an Indian Bengali politician and lawyer, who served as the MLA for the Phulbari constituency in the Meghalaya Legislative Assembly from 2018 to 2023. He is also a member of the Garo Hills Autonomous District Council. He resigned from NPP and joined the All India Trinamool Congress on January 2023.

Early life and education
Mominin was born into a Bengali Muslim family in the village of Chibinang located in the Garo Hills of Meghalaya. His father was Abdul Jabbar Sarkar, and his brothers Rahibul Islam Sarkar and Manirul Islam Sarkar are politicians. His wife is a teacher at the Janapriya Higher Secondary School in Bholarbhita. Sarkar graduated from the Dhubri Law College in 2003 with a Bachelor of Laws degree. He owns land in Kaimbatapara and a building in Bholarbhita.

Career
Sarkar began his career as a teacher before stepping into politics. As a National People's Party candidate, he defeated three-time MLA Abu Taher Mondal of the Indian National Congress at the 2018 Meghalaya Legislative Assembly election, winning a seat at the Phulbari constituency.

References

Meghalaya MLAs 2018–2023
21st-century Bengalis
People from West Garo Hills district
21st-century Indian Muslims
Indian Sunni Muslims
1976 births
Living people
Trinamool Congress politicians from Meghalaya
National People's Party (India) politicians